The Lords of Ligny, later Counts of Ligny, ruled the fief of Ligny-en-Barrois during the Middle Ages. In 1240, the seigniory of Ligny-en-Barrois was given by Henry II of Bar as the dowry of his daughter Marguerite, who married Henry V of Luxemburg (Henry I of Ligny). Henry bestowed it upon his younger son Waleran in 1281, who was killed at the Battle of Worringen in 1288. In 1364, it was elevated to a county by Guy I, and remained in the Luxembourg family and their descendants (with an interruption 1476–1510) until 1719, when it was sold to the Duke of Lorraine by Charles-Francis.

Lords of Ligny

Counts of Ligny